Chhean Vam (19 April 1916 – 19 January 2000) was a Cambodian politician and nationalist. He was Prime Minister of Cambodia from February to August 1948. He was a co-founder of the Democratic Party in 1946.

References

 

 
 

1916 births
2000 deaths
20th-century Cambodian politicians 
Cambodian independence activists
Cambodian expatriates in France 
Government ministers of Cambodia
Defence ministers of Cambodia
Prime Ministers of Cambodia
Democratic Party (Cambodia) politicians